Mandale is an unincorporated community in Alamance County, North Carolina, United States.

Mandale is located on North Carolina Highway 87, south of Eli Whitney, and northwest of Pittsboro.

References

Unincorporated communities in North Carolina
Unincorporated communities in Alamance County, North Carolina